The fifth season of Desperate Housewives, an American television series created by Marc Cherry, began airing on ABC on September 28, 2008, and concluded on May 17, 2009. The season takes place five years after the events of the season four finale in 2008 and continues to focus on the lives of Wisteria Lane residents Susan Mayer, Lynette Scavo, Bree Hodge, Gabrielle Solis, Edie Britt and Katherine Mayfair, as seen through the eyes of the series' deceased narrator, Mary Alice Young. The season's mystery is centered on Edie Britt's third husband, Dave Williams. The series received media attention following the announcement that Edie, portrayed by Nicollette Sheridan, would be killed off close to the end of the season. Edie takes on the narration in "Look Into Their Eyes and You See What They Know" following her death, marking the second time Mary Alice's voice is not heard in an episode.

The series saw its lowest ratings up to that point in season five. Nevertheless, Desperate Housewives maintained its position as a top-ten series. It was the ninth most-watched series during the 2008–09 television season with an average of 14.8 million viewers per episode.

Season five was released on DVD by ABC Studios as the seven-disc set Desperate Housewives: The Complete Fifth Season — The Red Hot Edition on September 1, 2009 in Region 1, October 21, 2009 in Region 4, and November 9 in Region 2.

Production
Filming began on July 7, 2008 and finished in March 2009.

There was much speculation about the fifth season of the show, due to the many cliffhangers at the end of season four, such as the departure of Edie Britt, and whether she would return after the events of the "Mother Said" episode. When asked about Sheridan's departure, Cherry commented "She won't be back for a few years", a reference to the 'five-year leap' that the show is undertaking. Edie returned to Wisteria Lane with a new husband, Dave, played by Neal McDonough, who joined the cast as a series regular. However, Sheridan left Desperate Housewives towards the end of the season when her character Edie died in an accident involving her car and a dangerous electrical wire in the 18th episode of Season 5, "A Spark. To Pierce the Dark.", which aired on March 22, 2009.

There had also been speculation whether the character of Mike Delfino would return, after the final scene in season four, set five years into the future, which showed Susan in the arms of a new mystery man, Jackson (Gale Harold). The fate of Mike Delfino was later revealed by actor James Denton, who plays Mike, when he told People magazine that he would definitely be returning in Season 5. However, "Mike and Susan have definitely split up," Denton told People.

On October 14, 2008, Gale Harold was seriously injured in a motorcycle accident. His character, Jackson, plays a pivotal role in the fifth season's eighth episode "City on Fire", which finds several Wisteria Lane residents trapped inside a nightclub fire. Cherry said Harold had been filming scenes all week for the episode and had been scheduled to be on set Tuesday, the day of the accident. Marc Cherry said they would await the actor's prognosis before deciding how to proceed, but that at least some changes would have to be made: "We know we're going to rewrite one scene," he said. The show issued a statement: "Gale is part of the 'Desperate Housewives' family and our thoughts and wishes are with him for a speedy recovery." Despite Harold's injury and ongoing recovery, no major Desperate Housewives production disruptions were expected.

Cast

The fifth season had thirteen roles receiving star billing, with eleven out of twelve returning from the previous season. The series is narrated by Brenda Strong, who portrays the deceased Mary Alice Young, as she observes from beyond the grave the lives of the Wisteria Lane residents and her former best friends. Teri Hatcher portrayed Susan Mayer, now separated from Mike and in a relationship with her painter. Felicity Huffman portrayed Lynette Scavo, who deals with her now teenage sons. Marcia Cross portrayed Bree Hodge, who has become a successful business woman and author. Eva Longoria portrayed Gabrielle Solis, who has lost her money and beauty and now looks after a blind husband and two daughters. Nicollette Sheridan portrayed Edie Williams, who returns to Wisteria Lane with a new husband after leaving the neighborhood towards the end of the previous season. Ricardo Antonio Chavira portrayed Carlos Solis, Gabrielle's husband who is still blind but with a chance to recover his sight and his career as a business executive. Doug Savant portrayed Tom Scavo, Lynette's husband who is facing a mid-life crisis. Kyle MacLachlan portrayed Orson Hodge, Bree's husband who feels overshadowed by her success. Dana Delany portrayed Katherine Mayfair, Bree's business partner and Mike's new girlfriend. James Denton portrayed Mike Delfino, Susan's ex-husband and the target of a man who seeks revenge on him. Shawn Pyfrom was promoted from an "also starring" credit to a formal "starring" credit playing Andrew Van de Kamp, Bree's homosexual son who now works with her in her business.  Also joining the principal cast was actor Neal McDonough as Dave Williams, whose mysterious arc is the season's main storyline.  Andrea Bowen departed from the principal cast but was credited as "special guest star" in the episode "City on Fire" playing the role of Julie Mayer, Susan's daughter, who is now attending college.

The "also starring" cast had many changes. The roles of the Scavo children were recast in order to reflect their new ages following the time jump. Charlie and Max Carver  replaced Shane and Brent Kinsman as Porter and Preston Scavo, respectively. The Kinsman twins appeared in a flashback in this episode. Joshua Logan Moore was cast as Parker Scavo, a role previously played by Zane Huett, and Kendall Applegate joined the cast as Penny Scavo, who had previously been portrayed by several toddler actresses. Huett did not return for this season. Joy Lauren left the "also starring" cast too, but made two guest appearances as Danielle Katz, Bree's daughter.

Many established guest stars from previous seasons also returned. Kathryn Joosten portrayed Karen McCluskey, one of the most prominent residents of Wisteria Lane. Richard Burgi portrayed Karl Mayer, Susan's ex-husband and Bree's new divorce lawyer. Tuc Watkins and Kevin Rahm respectively played Bob Hunter and Lee McDermott, a gay lawyer and his husband. Part of Susan's storyline were Gale Harold appearing as Jackson Braddock, a painter and Susan's new love interest, Mason Vale Cotton playing M.J. Delfino, Susan and Mike's son, and John Rubinstein portraying Principal Hobson, headmaster at M.J.'s school. Part of Lynette's storyline were Polly Bergen in the role of her mother Stella Wingfield, Gail O'Grady appearing as Anne Schilling, the mother of Porter's best friend who starts an affair with him, and Peter Onorati portraying Warren Schilling, Anne's abusive husband and owner of a club that is burnt down. Part of Gabrielle's storyline were Madison De La Garza and Daniella Baltodano respectively playing Juanita and Celia Solis, stepmother Gaby's troublesome daughters, Jeff Doucette appearing as Father Crowley, priest at the local Catholic church, Frances Conroy portraying Virginia Hildebrand, a rich woman that hires Carlos to become her personal massage therapist, David Starzyk playing Bradley Scott, Carlos's boss after he regains his sight, Ion Overman portraying Maria Scott, Bradley's wife, Megan Hilty acting as Shayla Grove, Bradley's mistress, Lesley Boone in the role of Lucy Blackburn, Carlos's ex-girlfriend from college, and future series regular Maiara Walsh, who appeared as Carlos's niece Ana Solis in the season finale. Part of the main mystery arc were Stephen Spinella portraying Dr. Samuel Heller, Dave's psychiatrist, and Lily Tomlin playing Roberta Simonds, Mrs. McCluskey's sister who helps her to do some research on Dave.

For the 100th episode of the series, many former cast members returned, including Steven Culp as Rex Van de Kamp, Bree's deceased first husband, Christine Estabrook as Martha Huber, the woman that blackmailed Mary Alice and was killed by Paul Young, and Lucille Soong as Yao Lin, Gabrielle's former maid. Beau Bridges made a special guest appearance as Eli Scruggs, Wisteria Lane's handyman who managed to help every one of the housewives in a different way.

Episodes

Reception

The fifth season received mostly positive reviews.

Ratings

United States

United Kingdom

Republic of Ireland on RTÉ 2
 Desperate Housewives airs Tuesdays at 9:55pm on RTÉ 2 in Ireland.
 All ratings below are supplied from the RTÉ Guide TV guide. The ratings are supplied by TAM Ireland/Nielsen TAM.
 Out of the 19 episodes of ratings available, season 5 averaged approx. 409,000 viewers. (Please note 19 out of the 24 episodes ratings are available.).

DVD release

References

External links
 

 
2008 American television seasons
2009 American television seasons